Robo-Squad is an action-sports game for the Atari Lynx published by Atari Corporation in 1990.

Gameplay 

Robo-Squad is an action-sports game.

Plot 

The year is 2810 and the president has died leaving "the United World Federation in Chaos." In order solve the dispute you have been sent to compete for control of the planets and the domination of the galaxy in a friendly game of Robs-Squash.

Development and release

Reception 

Robo-Squash was met with mostly positive reception. Computer and Video Games reviewed the game in their March 1991 issue giving it a score of 70 out of 100. Julian Boardman reviewed the game for Raze in their April 1991 issue. In his short notes he wrote that the game was "Addictive" with "engrossing gameplay" giving a score of 82%. Robert A. Jung reviewed the game which was published on IGN in 1999. In his review he  went on to say "A good, slightly above-average game. Playing it by yourself is fine, since the difficulty levels let you tune the computer to your skills. I suspect, though, that playing it with another person would be more fun. Best for players who are looking for a sports-type game for the Lynx." This giving a final score of 7 out of 10.

References

External links 
 Robo-Squash at AtariAge
 Robo-Squash at GameFAQs
 Robo-Squash at MobyGames

1990 video games
Atari Lynx games
Atari Lynx-only games
NuFX games
Sports video games
Video games developed in the United States
Video games set in the 29th century